Zimmern may refer to:

Places in Germany
Zimmern, Bad Langensalza, in the Unstrut-Hainich district, Thuringia
Zimmern, Saale-Holzland-Kreis, in the Saale-Holzland district, Thuringia
Zimmern ob Rottweil, in Baden-Württemberg
Zimmern unter der Burg, in Baden-Württemberg
Groß-Zimmern, in Hesse

People with the surname
Von Zimmern, Swabian family of barons/counts
Alice Zimmern (1855–1939), English writer, translator and suffragist
Alfred Eckhard Zimmern (1879–1957), British classical scholar and historian
Andrew Zimmern (born 1961), American food writer, dining critic, radio talk show host, TV personality and chef
George Samuel Zimmern (1904–1979), Hong Kong social activist and educator
Helen Zimmern (1846–1934), German-British writer and translator
Katharina von Zimmern (1478-1547), last abbess of Fraumünster Abbey

Fictional
Luke Zimmern was a fictional German economist and social scientist whose name appears in The Shape of Things to Come by H. G. Wells

Surnames of German origin